Scythris digitibasella is a moth of the family Scythrididae. It was described by Kari Nupponen and Aidas Saldaitis in 2013. It is found in Yemen (Socotra).

References

digitibasella
Moths described in 2013
Endemic fauna of Socotra